The Cenarth Falls is a cascade of waterfalls just upstream of the road bridge in the village of Cenarth in Ceredigion, bordering Carmarthenshire and Pembrokeshire, Wales.

They are notable as the first significant barrier on the River Teifi that salmon and migratory seatrout encounter on their return to their home river as they make their way upstream to spawn. Because of this, and the very attractive setting of the falls in a natural wooded valley, the falls have become a significant visitor attraction in Ceredigion, including in the autumn when the fish can be watched leaping up the falls.  A dramatic painting of the falls was made by Frank Miles and is now at Nottingham City Museum.   Miles's father inherited Cardigan Priory from his father, Philip John Miles, but lived in Nottinghamshire as Rector of Bingham.

The less well-known Henllan Falls a few miles upstream of Cenarth provides similar opportunities to watch fish migration.

In the 19th and early 20th centuries a leat drew water from behind the falls to power a watermill situated just upstream of the falls on the southern bank. The mill remains to this day but is no longer operational.

References

Waterfalls of Ceredigion
Tourist attractions in Ceredigion